Jonathan Holden, the first Poet Laureate of Kansas, was a Professor of English at Kansas State University, Manhattan, Kansas. Chosen in 2004, his two-year term began July 1, 2005. He was succeeded by Denise Low on July 1, 2007.

Biography/education
Holden was born in 1941 in Morristown, New Jersey. He received a Bachelor of Arts in English from Oberlin College in 1963. From 1963 to 1965, he was an editorial assistant for Cambridge Book Company in Bronxville, New Jersey. He then taught math at a high school in West Orange, New Jersey until 1968. In 1970, he received an Master of Arts in creative writing from San Francisco State College. He received a PhD in English from the University of Colorado in 1974. From 1974 to 1978, he was " poet in residence at Stephens College in Columbia, Missouri. He moved to Manhattan, Kansas in 1978 where he joined Kansas State University. There he became "poet in residence" and University Distinguished Professor of English. In 1991, he became Thursten P. Morton Professor at the University of Louisville. In 2000, he served on the Pulitzer Prize poetry selection committee. In 2004, the governor appointed him poet laureate, with his term beginning the following July 1, 2005.

As Poet Laureate
During his tenure as Kansas Poet Laureate, Holden instigated a statewide video teleconf program titled SHOPTALK, in conjunction with Kansas State University’s TELENET 2 program. SHOPTALK provided insight to poetry and poetry writing; the program provided a platform for Mr. Holden to have interactive poetry discussions with a live audience.  Several notable Kansas poets appeared as guests on the program.

As Poet Laureate, Holden was also active as an advisor for "kansaspoets.com", a website specifically dedicated to Kansas poets and poetry.  As well, Holden was guest editor for The Midwest Quarterly. The particular issue cited features over 60 Kansas poets plus special recognition to both Jonathan Holden and Denise Low. The issue received a very positive review from Literary Magazine Review (V. 25 Nos. 3 & 4 Fall & Winter), Jennifer Brantley, editor.

Publications and awards
Jonathan Holden published 18 books, all monographs, in addition to more than 190 poems published in professional journals.

Publications
 Design for a House: Poems, University of Missouri Press, 1972
 The Mark to Turn: A Reading of William Stafford's Poetry, University Press of Kansas, 1976.
 The Rhetoric of the Contemporary Lyric, Indiana University Press, 1980.
 Leverage, University Press of Virginia, 1983
 Falling from Stardom, Carnegie-Mellon University Press, 1984.
 The Names of the Rapids, University of Massachusetts Press, 1985.
 Style and Authenticity of Postmodern Poetry, University of Missouri Press, 1986.
 Landscapes of the Self: The Development of Richard Hugo's Poetry, Associated Faculty Press, 1986.
 Against Paradise, University of Utah Press, 1990.
 The Fate of American Poetry, University of Georgia Press, 1991
 American Gothic: Poems, University of Georgia Press, 1992.
 Brilliant Kids, University of Utah Press, 1992.
 The Sublime: Poems, University of North Texas Press, 1995.
 Guns and Boyhood in America, University of Michigan Press, 1997.
 The Old Formalism: Character in Contemporary American Poetry, University of Arkansas Press, 1999.
 Knowing: New and Selected Poems, University of Arkansas Press, 2000.
 Mama's Boys: A Double Life, Lewis-Clark Press, 2007

Awards
1972	Devins Award for Poetry
1974  	National Endowment for the Humanities grant
1975  	Borestone Mountain Poetry Awards
1978  	Aspen Foundation for the Arts Prize
1979  	Kansas Quarterly first award
1982	Associated Writing Programs award series in poetry
1984, 1985 National Endowment for the Arts creative writing fellowship
1985	Juniper Prize
1986 	Distinguished Faculty Award
1995	Vassar Miller Prize

Sources
www.jonathanholden.com
www.kansaspoets.com
Biles, Jan . "Passion for poetry drives incoming poet laureate." The Capital-Journal. May 26, 2007. Online. May 2, 2008.
Contemporary Authors Online, Gale, 2008. Reproduced in Biography Resource Center. Farmington Hills, Mich.: Gale, 2008. Document Number: H1000046450. Online. May 2, 2008.
Eberhart, John Mark."State lines: Rhyme on one side, no reason on the other." Kansas City Star.  2004-12-26. Page 7. Online. May 2, 2008.
K-State media guide -- Jonathan Holden bio. Online. May 2, 2008.]

References

Further reading

1941 births
Living people
People from Morristown, New Jersey
Oberlin College alumni
San Francisco State University alumni
University of Colorado alumni
Stephens College faculty
Writers from Manhattan, Kansas
American academics of English literature
Poets Laureate of Kansas